The Copper John is a nymph type artificial fly used in fly fishing. It was created by John Barr of Boulder, Colorado  in the 1990s.  It is popular amongst fly tyers and numerous variations have been created.  Use of a tungsten bead, wire, and sometimes lead makes this slim nymph fly drop fast in the water to the depths where the fish are located and is often fished in murky water.  The Copper John is a general imitation of the nymph state of a Mayfly.


Origin
The original Copper John fly was first tied by John Barr of Boulder in 1993.  It underwent several variations until finalized in 1996.The original fly was tied with Turkey biots for the wing case and without epoxy over it.   Later, as "Thin Skin" material and epoxy resins became available, they were substituted until the fly was finalized.  The original was tied without a taper in the body but later changed to a slight taper using thread under the wire wrappings.  The original was tied with copper wire and is now commonly tied using green, pink, blue, or other colored wires to match the size of the hook.

Fishing        
The relatively heavy weight and thin profile of this fly allows it to descend fast in the water.  It is often used as a dropper fly in a hopper-dropper fly combination.  It is particularly useful when used to fish for trout in discolored water.  Smaller sizes of the fly are fished in the Fall and Spring and larger versions are fished in the summer when food is more available.

References

Nymph patterns